Alpha Cygni variables are variable stars which exhibit non-radial pulsations, meaning that some portions of the stellar surface are contracting at the same time other parts expand. They are supergiant stars of spectral types B or A. Variations in brightness on the order of 0.1 magnitudes are associated with the pulsations, which often seem irregular, due to beating of multiple pulsation periods.  The pulsations typically have periods of several days to several weeks.

The prototype of these stars, Deneb (α Cygni), exhibits fluctuations in brightness between magnitudes +1.21 and +1.29.  Small amplitude rapid variations have been known in many early supergiant stars, but they were not formally grouped into a class until the 4th edition of the General Catalogue of Variable Stars was published in 1985.  It used the acronym ACYG for Alpha Cygni variable stars.  Many luminous blue variables (LBVs) show Alpha Cygni-type variability during their quiescent (hot) phases, but the LBV classification is generally used in these cases.

A large number (32) were discovered by Christoffel Waelkens and colleagues analysing Hipparcos data in a 1998 study.

Pulsations
The pulsations of Alpha Cygni Variable stars are not fully understood.  They are not confined to a narrow range of temperatures and luminosities in the way that most pulsating stars are.  Instead, most luminous A and B supergiants, and possibly also O and F stars, show some type of unpredictable small-scale pulsations.  Nonadiabatic strange mode radial pulsations are predicted but only for the most luminous supergiants.  Pulsations have also been modelled for less luminous supergiants by assuming they are low mass post-red supergiant stars, but most Alpha Cygni variables do not appear to have passed through the red supergiant stage.

The pulsations are likely induced by kappa mechanism, caused by iron opacity variations, with strange modes producing the observed short periods for both radial and non-radial pulsations.  Non-adiabatic g-modes may produce longer period variations, but these have not been observed in Alpha Cygni variables.

List

Galactic

Extragalactic

References

Sources
Samus N.N., Durlevich O.V., et al. Combined General Catalog of Variable Stars (GCVS4.2, 2004 Ed.)